Robert Italo Lenarduzzi, OBC (born May 1, 1955) is a former North American Soccer League player, Canadian international, and coach of the Canadian national and Olympic soccer teams. He is currently club liaison for Vancouver Whitecaps FC. He is a member of the National Soccer Hall of Fame.

Club career
Lenarduzzi began his professional playing career as a midfielder and defender at age 15 with Reading in the English Football League and went on to play 67 first-team games and score two goals with the club. Lenarduzzi then also joined the NASL Vancouver Whitecaps in 1974 in the team's first season. Until 1976, he divided his time between Vancouver in the summer and Reading in the winter. He played 11 seasons for Vancouver until the Whitecaps' last season in 1984, when the league folded. Lenarduzzi holds the record for most games played in the league, with 312. Lenarduzzi played all eleven positions during his tenure with the team, including 45 minutes as goalkeeper. He was also voted NASL North American player of the year in 1978. The Whitecaps won the NASL Soccer Bowl championship in 1979. In 1984, Lenarduzzi joined the Tacoma Stars of Major Indoor Soccer League (MISL). He spent two seasons with them before in 1986 becoming executive director of the Vancouver 86ers of the Canadian Soccer League. In 1987, he returned to the field as a player and a coach with the 86ers.

Indoor career
Lenarduzzi and two Vancouver teammates spent the 1979–80 NASL Indoor season on loan to the Los Angeles Aztecs, as the Whitecaps themselves did not field an indoor team for that year. Vancouver did participate in three subsequent indoor seasons, and Lenarduzzi featured in all three for the Whitecaps.

National team playing career
Lenarduzzi earned 48 caps playing for Canada. He played all the country's matches both as the squad progressed to the quarterfinals of the 1984 Summer Olympics and as it participated in the first round of the 1986 World Cup finals.

International goals
Scores and results list Canada's goal tally first.

Coaching career
Lenarduzzi resumed his pro career in 1987 as a player–coach with the newly formed Vancouver 86ers of the newly founded Canadian Soccer League. After retiring permanently from playing in September 1988, he continued to coach the 86ers for the next five seasons. He led the franchise to four consecutive CSL titles from 1988 to 1991. His team set a record for professional North American sports teams by going 46 games unbeaten between June 6, 1988, and August 8, 1989.

Canada national team

Lenarduzzi was the head coach for the Canadian men's national team briefly in 1989 and for a longer term that started in 1992. In his first of two bids to see Canada back through to a World Cup finals, his squad twice came close but failed to progress to the 1994 finals. First they lost at home to Mexico despite scoring the game's first goal in a game with which Canada could have gone through to the finals with a win. (See 1994 FIFA World Cup qualification (CONCACAF).) As CONCACAF qualifying winners-up, Canada then lost the away leg to Australia in a match decided by penalty kicks that saw the winner of the home-and-away series go on to play Argentina in a home-and-away series for a finals spot (won by Argentina).

In qualifying for the 1998 finals, Canada failed to finish in the top three of a six-nation CONCACAF final qualifying round league tournament and progress. (See 1998 FIFA World Cup qualification (CONCACAF).) Lenarduzzi subsequently resigned his post in 1997.

Administrative career
Lenarduzzi served as 86ers general manager from 1988 to 1993. He resumed the post in 1998 and was named the A-League's executive of the year for 2000. In 2001, he also assumed the position of the Whitecaps Head of Soccer Operations. (The 86ers changed their name to Whitecaps in 2001.)

During the 2008 MLS season, Lenarduzzi served as colour commentator during CBC Television's Toronto FC broadcasts before Jason DeVos arrived to fill the position on a more permanent basis.

Lenarduzzi was the president of Vancouver Whitecaps FC from the time it entered Major League Soccer until August 15, 2019, when the role was eliminated in favour of the role of sporting director. He then became club liaison.

Honours
In 2001, Lenarduzzi was inducted as a player into the Canadian Soccer Hall of Fame. In 2005, he was awarded the Order of British Columbia. In 2003, he was inducted into the U.S. National Soccer Hall of Fame. Lenarduzzi was voted one of the Top 30 Players of the Century in the Confederation of North, Central America and Caribbean Association Football (CONCACAF) region.

References

External links
 / Canada Soccer Hall of Fame
National Soccer Hall of Fame and Museum (in the U.S.) with its 2003 induction page on Lenarduzzi

1955 births
Living people
1986 FIFA World Cup players
Association football commentators
Association football defenders
Association football utility players
Businesspeople from Vancouver
Canada men's international soccer players
Canada men's national soccer team managers
Canadian expatriate sportspeople in England
Canadian expatriate sportspeople in the United States
Canadian expatriate soccer players
Canadian people of Italian descent
Canadian soccer chairmen and investors
Canadian soccer coaches
Canada Soccer Hall of Fame inductees
Canadian Soccer League (1987–1992) players
Canadian soccer players
CONCACAF Championship-winning players
English Football League players
Expatriate footballers in England
Expatriate soccer players in the United States
Footballers at the 1984 Summer Olympics
Los Angeles Aztecs players
Major Indoor Soccer League (1978–1992) players
Members of the Order of British Columbia
North American Soccer League (1968–1984) indoor players
National Soccer Hall of Fame members
North American Soccer League (1968–1984) players
Olympic soccer players of Canada
Outfield association footballers who played in goal
Reading F.C. players
Soccer players from Vancouver
Tacoma Stars players
USL First Division coaches
Vancouver Whitecaps (1974–1984) coaches
Vancouver Whitecaps (1974–1984) players
Vancouver Whitecaps (1986–2010) players
Vancouver Columbus players
People of Friulian descent